Friels is a surname. Notable people with the surname include: 

Colin Friels (born 1952), Scottish-born Australian actor
Gavin Friels (born 1977), Scottish footballer and manager

See also
 Freels (disambiguation)
 Friel
 O'Friel